Visible light may refer to light, or to:

The visible spectrum
Sunlight
A work included in The Collected Short Fiction of C. J. Cherryh